This is a list of educational institutions in Jharkhand

Central University

National Institute of Importance

National Law University

Deemed Universities

State Universities

Private Universities

Agriculture, Dairy and fisheries science
Agriculture College, Garhwa
College of Fisheries Science, Gumla
Rabindra Nath Tagore Agriculture College, Deoghar
Tilka manjhi agriculture college Godda
Phulo Jhano Murmu College of Dairy Technology, Hansdiha (Dumka)
College of Horticulture, Chaibasa

Defence
Jungle Warfare School, Netarhat, a defence college for state police and CRPF defence training.

Degree colleges
St. Columba's College, Hazaribagh (estb. in 1899)
Ananda College, Hazaribagh
Markham College of Commerce, Hazaribagh
St. Xavier's College, Ranchi
 Katras College, Katras, Dhanbad
 Marwari College, Ranchi 
Doranda College, Ranchi
Gossner College, Ranchi
Gossner Theological College, Ranchi
J.N College, Dhruwa (Ranchi)
Marwari College, Ranchi
Maulana Azad College, Ranchi
Nirmala College, Ranchi
Ranchi Women's College, Ranchi
St. Paul's College, Ranchi
Madhupur College, Jharkhand
Sanjay Gandhi Memorial College, Ranchi
Suraj Singh Memorial College, Ranchi
Ram Lakhan Singh Yadav College, Ranchi
Loyola College of Education, Jamshedpur
A.B.M College, Jamshedpur
The Graduate School College for Women, Jamshedpur
Jamshedpur Co-operative College
Jamshedpur Women’s College
Jamshedpur Worker’s College, estb. 1959
J. K. S. College, Jamshedpur
Karim City College, Jamshedpur (two campuses)
Lal Bahadur Shastri Memorial College, Jamshedpur
Raja Shiv Prasad College, Jharia, estb. in 1949 by Raja of Jharia
SSLNT Women's College, Dhanbad
Guru Nanak College, Dhanbad
Bholaram Sibal Kharkia College, Maithon (Dhanbad)
P. K. Roy Memorial College, Dhanbad
K. S. G. M. College Nirsa, Dhanbad
St. Xavier's College, Dumka
Bokaro Steel City College
Grizzly College of Education, Jhumri-Tilaiya
Sri Ram Krishna Mahila College, Giridih
Giridih College
Jamtara College
Sahebganj College
Godda College
Deoghar College
A.S College, Deoghar
Baidhyanath Kamal Kumari Sanskrit College
Rama Devi Bajla Mahila Mahavidyalaya, Deoghar
Tata College, Chaibasa
Simdega College
St. Xavier's College, Simdega
GC Jain Commerce College
Kartik Oraon College, Gumla
Ganesh Lal Agrawal College, Daltonganj
Yodh Singh Namdhari Mahila Mahavidyalaya
Sukhdeo Sahay Madheshwar Sahay Degree College, Tarhasi

Engineering Colleges
K. K. College of Engineering and Management, Gobindpur
Birla Institute of Technology, Deoghar
RVS College of Engineering & Technology, Jamshedpur
Guru Gobind Singh Educational Society's Technical Campus, Kandra (Bokaro)
Dumka Engineering College (PPP of Techno India and Govt. of Jharkhand)
Ramgarh Engineering College (PPP of Techno India and Govt. of Jharkhand)
Chaibasa Engineering College (PPP of Techno India and Govt. of Jharkhand)
University College of Engineering & Technology, Hazaribagh
B. A. College of Engineering & Technology, Jamshedpur
Cambridge Institute of Technology, Ranchi
Vidya Memorial Institute of Technology, Ranchi
Ram Tahal Chaudhary Institute of Technology, Ranchi
DAV Institute of Engineering & Technology, Medininagar
Nilaai Group of Institutions
Maryland Institute of Technology & Management, Jamshedpur
Bokaro Institute of Technology

Law colleges
 Bhishma Narain Singh Law College, Palamu
 Chotanagpur Law College, Ranchi
 Imam-ul-Haq Khan Law College, Bokaro Steel City
 Jharkhand Cooperative LAw College
 Jharkhand Vidhi Mahavidyalaya, Koderma
 Law College Dhanbad
 Radha Govind Law College, Ramgarh

Management
GD Bagaria Institute of Management, Giridih
Indian Institute of Coal Management, Ranchi
Institute of Management Studies, Ranchi
Institute of Science and Management, Ranchi
Kejriwal Institute of Management, Ranchi
Department of Commerce & Management, Netaji Subhas University, Jamshedpur

Medical Colleges

Nursing
School of Nursing (Bokaro General Hospital)
School of Nursing (Tata Main Hospital), Jamshedpur
College of Nursing, Rims, Ranchi
College of Nursing (Central Hospital), Dhanbad
Dhanbad College of Nursing (Asrafi Hospital)
Florence College of Nursing, Irba (Ranchi)
Department of Paramedical, Netaji Subhas University, Jamshedpur
Tribal College of Nursing, Namkum (Ranchi)
Metas Adventist College (Seventh-Day Adventist Hospital), Ranchi
St. Barnabas Hospital College of Nursing, Ranchi
Mahadevi Birla Institute of Nursing & Clinical Technology, Mahilong (Ranchi)

Polytechnic & MSME Institutes
Al Kabir Polytechnic, Jamshedpur
Department of Polytechnic, Netaji Subhas University, Jamshedpur
Govt. Women's Polytechnic, Bokaro
Govt. Women Polytechnic, Gamharia
Govt. Polytechnic, Khutri, Bokaro
Govt. Polytechnic, Dhanbad
Govt. Polytechnic, Nirsa
Govt. Polytechnic, Bhaga (earlier Mining Institute Bhaga), estb. in 1905.
Madhupur Polytechnic College
Govt. Polytechnic, Ranchi
Govt. Polytechnic, Adityapur
Govt. Polytechnic, Kharsawan
Khandoli Institute of Technology, Giridih
Pemiya Rishikesh Institute of Technology
Vidya Memorial Institute of Technology
Xavier Institute of Polytechnic & Technology, Namkum
Subhash Institute of Technology, Giridih
Gumla Polytechnic College
Chandil Polytechnic School (PPP of JIS Group and Govt. of Jharkhand)
Silli Polytechnic (PPP of Techno India & Govt. of Jharkhand)
Pakur Polytechnic College (PPP of Cybobhubaneswar Educational Foundation and Govt. of Jharkhand)
Ramgovind Institute of Technology, Koderma
Indo-Danish Tool Room, Jamshedpur
Jharkhand MSME Tool Room, Tatisilwai (Ranchi)
Govt. Tool Room & Training Centre, Dumka
Bano Model Degree College, Bano 
 Govt. Industrial Training Institute, Jamshedpur
Govt Industrial Training Centre for Women Jameshedpur
R. D. Tata Technical Education Center, Jamshedpur
Tata Steel Technical Institute, Jamshedpur

Research Institutes & Organisations
Research Center, Ranchi - ICAR Research Complex for Eastern Region
Indian Agricultural Research Institute (Ranchi Campus)
Indian Institute of Agricultural Biotechnology, Ranchi
The Indian Institute of Natural Resins and Gums
National Metallurgical Laboratory (NML), one of the 38 Council of Scientific and Industrial Research  (CSIR) labs.
Central Institute of Mining and Fuel Research (a constituent lab. of CSIR), Dhanbad
Dr Ram Dayal Munda Tribal Welfare Research Institute, Ranchi
Central Institute of Plastic Engineering & Technology, Ranchi
Bihar Institute of Mining and Mine Surveying, Ranchi

See also
 Education in India
 List of educational institutes in Jamshedpur

References 

Jharkhand
Education
Education in Jharkhand